The Siemens-Schuckert Dr.I was a German single seat triplane fighter aircraft first flown in 1917.  Its development and that of a more powerful, uncompleted variant, was abandoned after a flight test programme.

Design and development

The Dr.I was a single seat triplane developed at the same time as the Siemens-Schuckert D.II. It used the flat sided fuselage of the earlier Siemens-Schuckert D.I biplane rather than that of the rounded D.II.  Like the D.I the Dr.III was powered by a  Siemens-Halske Sh.I nine cylinder rotary engine.

The fighter was first flown in July 1917.  Later in its development programme the Dr.I crashed and was seriously damaged.  Siemens-Schuckert rebuilt it, though adding 2.90 m2 (31.2 sq ft) to the wing area.

Construction of a version powered by a more powerful  Siemens-Halske Sh.III eleven cylinder rotary engine, the Dr.II, was well advanced when it was abandoned.

Specifications (before reconstruction)

References

Triplanes
1910s German fighter aircraft
Dr.I
Single-engined tractor aircraft
Aircraft first flown in 1917